Sascha Kotysch (born 2 October 1988) is a German former professional footballer who played as a defender .

Club career
Kotysch joined 1. FC Kaiserslautern in 2000 as a youth player having moved from regional team SV Gauersheim. In the 2006–07 season, he played for the reserve team of FCK. He made such a good impression in the second string that former manager Wolfgang Wolf gave him his first team debut. In his first season, he only played eight times for the first team but over time had a more important role to play and thus was rewarded with his first professional contract.

International career
Kotysch is a youth international footballer for Germany.

References

External links
 
 

1988 births
Living people
People from Kirchheimbolanden
German footballers
Footballers from Rhineland-Palatinate
Association football defenders
Germany youth international footballers
1. FC Kaiserslautern II players
1. FC Kaiserslautern players
Sint-Truidense V.V. players
Oud-Heverlee Leuven players
2. Bundesliga players
Belgian Pro League players
Challenger Pro League players
German expatriate footballers
German expatriate sportspeople in Belgium
Expatriate footballers in Belgium